S. F. Sound Furniture is the fourth album by the Japanese electronica band Capsule, released in 2004.

"Super Scooter Happy" was covered by Kyary Pamyu Pamyu on her 2013 album, Nanda Collection.

Track listing

2004 albums
Capsule (band) albums
Albums produced by Yasutaka Nakata